Kianderi is a settlement in Kenya's Central Province.

References 

Kirinyaga County
Populated places in Central Province (Kenya)